Thornborough is a rural town and locality in the Shire of Mareeba, Queensland, Australia. In the  the locality of Thornborough had a population of 9 people.

It rose to prominence in the 1870s as a gold mining town in the Hodgkinson Minerals Area. Today, there are very few buildings remaining in the town.

Geography 
The town of Kingsborough, another former mining town, is located to the north-east of the town of Thornborough.

History
Thornborough was named in 1876 after George Henry Thorn, the then Queensland Premier.

By May 1877, the streets were laid out and named after pioneers of north Queensland, such as James Venture Mulligan and William (Billy) McLeod and Muirson.

Thornborough Provisional School opened circa 1878. In 1909 it became Thornborough State School. It operated as a half-time school in conjunction with Dimbulah School (meaning the schools shared a single teacher) in 1918 and then closed. It reopened in 1920 and closed on 1925.

Wolfram Camp Provisional School opened in 1905. On 1 January 1909 it became Wolfram Camp State School and was renamed that year to be Wolfram State School. It closed in 1930, reopened in 1938 and then closed finally circa 1940.

In the  the locality of Thornborough had a population of 9 people.

Heritage listings 
Thorborough has a number of heritage-listed sites, including:
 off Dimbulah-Mount Mulligan Road, Kingsborough: General Grant Mine
 off former East Street (now Kingsborough-Thornborough Road), Kingsborough: Kingsborough Battery
 Kingsborough-Thornborough Road: Tyrconnel Mine and Battery

References

External links 

 
Towns in Queensland
Shire of Mareeba
Mining towns in Queensland
Localities in Queensland